The Asceticon ("ascetic discourses") by Abba Isaiah of Scetis is a diverse anthology of essays by an Egyptian Christian monk who left Scetis around 450 AD.

Contents
Originally composed in Greek, the Asceticon consists of 30 essays ("logos" in singular, "logoi" in plural) on subjects including: advice for novice monks; precepts for those who have renounced the world; sayings and stories by Abba Isaiah; various letters, sermons, and sayings. Logos 30 includes several sayings that were also included in the Apophthegmata Patrum (Sayings of the Desert Fathers), but in a different form, giving scholars some evidence on how those sayings evolved into their final form in the Apophthegmata Patrum. Abba Isaiah was also influential in bringing Christianity to Palestine.

The 29 discourses in John Chryssavgis's translation of the Asceticon are:

Rules for the brothers who live with him
On the natural state of the intellect
On the condition of beginners and anchorites
On the conscience of those who stay in their cells
Faithful commandments for the edification of those who wish to live peacefully together
On those who desire to lead a life of good silence
On virtues
Sayings
Commands for those who have renounced (the world)
Another discourse
On the grain of mustard seed
On wine
On those who have struggled and reached perfection
Acts of mourning
On detachment
On the joy that comes to the soul that desires to serve God
On thoughts about renunciation and exile
On forgiveness
On passions
On humility
On repentance
On the conduct of the new person
On perfection
On tranquillity
To Abba Peter, his disciple
Recorded by Isaiah's disciple, Abba Peter, who had heard it spoken by his master
In which he says, "attend diligently"
The branches of malice
Lamentations

Sogdian fragments
The Asceticon was read and translated by the Nestorians of Central Asia. A Sogdian fragment of the 4th discourse, translated from Syriac, was found in MC C2, along with part of a commentary on the 15th discourse by Dadisho Qatraya.

See also
 Apophthegmata Patrum
 Ethiopic Collectio Monastica
 Vitae Patrum

Bibliography
Chryssavgis, John and Pachomios (Robert) Penkett (eds). Abba Isaiah of Scetis: Ascetic Discourses. Kalamazoo, MI: Cistercian Publications, 2003. (English translation)
de Broc, H. Isaïe de Scété: recueil ascétique, 2nd ed. Bégrolles-en-Mauges: Abbaye de Bellefontaine, 1985. (French translation)
Draguet, René. Les cinq recensions de l'Ascéticon syriaque d'Abba Isaïe. Louvain: Secrétariat du Corpus SCO, 1968. [Pages 289–290 (Syriac text), 293–294 (Greek and Latin texts and French translation)]

Notes

Church Fathers
Asceticism
Hesychast literature
Egyptian hermits
Christian monasticism